Sport Club Corinthians Paulista's Base Categories is the youth system of Corinthians. The youth system is composed of several age categories ranging from Under-11s to Under-20s. The academy teams play in the state-wide Federação Paulista de Futebol-organized competitions (U-11 to U-20), the Brazilian Football Confederation-organized national championships (U-17 to U-20), and in the prestigious Copa São Paulo de Futebol Júnior (U-20).

Corinthians' academy is one of Brazil's most successful, winning 10 Copa São Paulo de Futebol Júnior, 1 Campeonato Brasileiro Sub-20 and 1 Copa do Brasil Sub-17 titles altogether. Numerous international players have graduated from the academy team.

Competitions

Players

Note: Shirt numbers refer to first-team matches. Academy matches numbers are issued on a match-by-match basis.

Under-23s
Note: Corinthians deactivated the under-23s squad in 2022. Some under-23s players remain under contract and are available for some competitions.

Under-20s
Note: Players currently part of the under-20 squad

Note: Players yet to be registered to any competition

Under-17s
Note: Only players with a professional contract

Staff

Academy Graduates
— Academy graduates who still play for Corinthians, including those that are currently out on loan to other clubs, are in bold.

Notable Graduates

Graduates (2011-present)

Honours
Copa São Paulo de Futebol Júnior: 10
1969, 1970, 1995, 1999, 2004, 2005, 2009, 2012, 2015, 2017
Campeonato Brasileiro Sub-20: 1
2014
Copa do Brasil Sub-17: 1
2016
Taça Belo Horizonte de Juniores: 1
2015
Mundial de Clubes de La Comunidad de Madrid Sub-17: 1
2010, 2011, 2015
Dallas Cup: 1
1999, 2000
Campeonato Paulista Série B3: 1
2003

References

Academy
Corinthians